Majed Al Amri is a Saudi Arabian footballer who plays for Al-Thoqbah as a defender. He represented the Saudi Arabia national team in the 2007 Asian Cup.

He also played for Al Shabab and Al Ittifaq.

References

External links
 

1985 births
Living people
Saudi Arabian footballers
Ettifaq FC players
2007 AFC Asian Cup players
Al-Nahda Club (Saudi Arabia) players
Al-Shabab FC (Riyadh) players
Al-Shoulla FC players
Al-Kawkab FC players
Al-Thoqbah Club players
Al Jeel Club players
Saudi First Division League players
Saudi Professional League players
Saudi Second Division players
Saudi Third Division players
Association football defenders
Saudi Arabia international footballers